George Woodman Hilton (January 18, 1925 – August 4, 2014) was a United States historian and economist, who specialized in social history, transportation economics, regulation by commission, the history of economic thought and labor history.

Early life and education 
Born in Chicago, Hilton attended Dartmouth College and earned his BA in Economics summa cum laude in 1946. He obtained his MA in 1950. Hilton attended the London School of Economics in 1953–1955, and obtained his PhD from the University of Chicago in 1956.

Career 
He then taught for many years at the University of California, Los Angeles, and was later a Professor Emeritus of Economics at UCLA. He served as the Acting Curator of Rail Transportation at the Smithsonian Institution from July 1968 through June 1969. He died of heart disease in 2014, aged 89.

Publications

Books
  Hilton, G. W. (1954) Cable railways of Chicago, Electric Railway Historical Society.
 Hilton, G. W. (1960) The truck system including a history of the British truck acts 1465–1960
 
 
 Hilton, G. W. (1963) The Ma and Pa: A History of the Maryland and Pennsylvania Railroad. Howell-North Books (Second edition, 1980; revised, 1999, The Johns Hopkins University Press)
 Hilton, G. W. (1964) The Staten Island Ferry, Howell-North Books, First edition.
 Hilton, G. W. (1968) The Night Boat, Howell-North Books, First edition.
 Hilton, G. W. (1969) The Transportation Act of 1958: A decade of experience, Indiana University Press, First edition.
 Hilton, G. W. (1971) The Cable Car in America (Revised edition, 1982)
 Hilton, G. W. (1974) Federal Transit Subsidies: The Urban Mass Transportation Assistance Program. (AEI) 
 Hilton, G. W. (1975) The Northeast railroad problem (AEI)] Pdf.
 Hilton, G. W.; Jobe, Joseph and Plummer, Russell (1976) The illustrated history of paddle steamers Two Continents Publishing Group.
 Hilton, G. W. (1976) "What did we give wp with the big red cars?" (article)
 
 Hilton, G. W. (1987) Monon Route, Howell-North.
 
 Hilton, G. W. (1995) The annotated baseball stories of Ring W. Lardner, 1914–1919 Stanford University Press, First edition.
 Hilton, G. W. (1995) Eastland: legacy of the Titanic Stanford University Press.
 
 Hilton, G. W. (1997) Nellie Farren, Sir Arthur Sullivan Society.
 
 Hilton, G. W. (2002) Lake Michigan passenger steamers, Stanford University Press.
 Hilton, G. W. (2002) editor, The Front Page: From Theater to Reality, Hanover: Smith and Kraus, Inc.

Selected chapters and journal articles

Articles and comments
Published in Trains Magazine, 1945–1993:
 Pere Marquette, August 1945 issue, pages 7–21
 Tennessee Central, January 1946 issue, pages 8–15
 Meets All Trains, August 1946 issue, pages 48–49
 Carquinez Train Ferries, August 1946 issue, pages 36–39
 Where 19th Century Carferries Float On, March 1965 issue, pages 24–27
 What Does Manx Mean?, September 1966 issue, pages 24–27
 What Went Wrong and What to Do About It, January 1967 issue, pages 36–45
 Muckraking in a Day Coach, June 1968 issue, pages 48–50
 The Promise of Promontory, May 1969 issue, pages 20–28
 What Was Grand About Grand Central, September 1969 issue, pages 20–28
 Ralph in the Roundhouse, November 1970 issue, pages 44–47
 Please, No Hero for the North Western, January 1971 issue, pages 27–28
 Integration in the North, July 1971 issue, pages 36–43
 The View of the Viaduct from in Front of the Diner, May 1972 issue, pages 20–25
 What Does the ICC Cost You and Me?, October 1972 issue, pages 24–28
 Turntable: Good News from the Lehigh Valley, August 1973 issue, page 58
 Department-Store Mural, March 1974 issue, page 43
 Why Pre-Electronic Railroading Survives, May 1974 issue, pages 20–24
 Turntable: Railfanning as Education, November 1974 issue, page 66
 Great Lakes Car Ferries: An Endangered Species, January 1975 issue, pages 42–51
 Turntable: The View from Middle Age, November 1975 issue, page 82
 Slack, February 1976 issue, pages 22–28
 What Does the ICC Cost You and Me? Currently, That Is, June 1978 issue, pages 28–32
 The One Best Place to Watch Trains, December 1980 issue, pages 28–38
 Turntable: Infran-canin-ophilia, March 1983 issue, page 66
 Turntable: Railfanning without Railroads, September 1984 issue, page 70
 Turntable: Is Railroading Worth a Lifetime?, February 1985 issue, page 70
 Turntable: In Praise of the Unbuilt, February 1986 issue, page 70
 Turntable: What Should Be Preserved from the ICC, November 1987 issue, page 90
 Perspectives: The Trains Were in Transition, and It Was a Fascinating Railroad Business, November 1990 issue, pages 82–83
 ABCs of Railroading: A History of Track Gauge, September 1992 issue, pages 23–24
 Regrets from Early Youth, July 1993 issue, page 76

References

University of California, Los Angeles faculty
1925 births
2014 deaths
20th-century American economists
21st-century American economists
Alumni of the London School of Economics
Dartmouth College alumni
Historians of economic thought
Labor historians
Rail transport writers
University of Chicago alumni
Historians from California